The Lex Alamannorum and Pactus Alamannorum were two early medieval law codes of the Alamanni. They were first edited in parts in 1530 by Johannes Sichard in Basel.

Pactus Alamannorum
The Pactus Alamannorum or Pactus legis Alamannorum is the older of the two codes, dating to the early 7th century. It is preserved in a single manuscript of the 9th to 10th century (Paris, Bibliothèque Nationale de France, MS Lat. 10753).

Lex Alamannorum
The Lex Alamannorum is preserved in some 50 manuscripts dating to between the 8th and 12th centuries. The text's first redaction is ascribed to the Alamannic duke Lantfrid in ca. 730. It is divided into clerical law, ducal law and popular law.

Chapter 3.1 treats church asylum: no fugitive seeking refuge in a church should be removed by force, or be killed within the church. Instead, the pursuers should assure the priest that the fugitive's guilt is forgiven. In 3.3, penalties for the violation of the asylum are set at 36 solidi to be paid to the church and an additional 40 solidi to be paid to the authorities for violation of the law.

Chapter 56.1 regulates penalties for violence towards women. If someone uncovers the head of a free, unmarried woman, he is fined 6 solidi. If he lifts her dress so that her genitals or her buttocks become visible, he is fined 12 solidi. If he rapes her, he is fined 40 solidi. 56.2 doubles these penalties if the victim is a married woman.

See also
Early Germanic law
Paris, BN, lat. 4404

References

 Clausdieter Schott: Lex Alamannorum - Gesetz und Verfassung der Alemannen (facsimile), Augsburg 1997 
 Johannes Merkel, Leges Alamannorum, Bayerische StaatsBibliothek 1863

External links 
 Information on the Lex Alamannorum and its manuscript tradition on the  website, A database on Carolingian secular law texts (Karl Ubl, Cologne University, Germany, 2012).

Alamanni
Alemanni
7th-century Latin books
8th-century Latin books
Trials by combat